The Gatlinburg Regional is the largest of over 100 regional tournaments sponsored by the American Contract Bridge League (ACBL).

The week long tournament attracts the top bridge players from all over the world.

The tournament is typically held in April and lasts a week. The tournament features pair events and team events - Swiss, Bracketed Swiss, Board-a-Match (BAM) and KO. The KO events are the largest events held by the ACBL throughout the year, typically attracting over 300 entries every day.

Attendance Figures 

The tournament was originally held every two years starting in 1968. After 1980, it became an annual event.

A table is four players playing for a single session (approximately 3 hours).

References

Contract bridge competitions